Hajj Samad Khan Mosque is related to the Qajar dynasty and is located in Rasht, Saadi Street.

References

Mosques in Gilan Province
Mosque buildings with domes
National works of Iran
Qajar architecture